William Marx (born 1966 in Villeneuve-lès-Avignon) is a French writer and researcher into literature. He is a researcher at the Collège de France, where he is professor of Comparative Literature. In 2010 he received the Montyon Prize of the Académie française. In 2022 he was elected a member of the Academia Europaea.

Publications

References

21st-century French writers
Montyon Prize laureates
1966 births
Living people
French literary historians
Academic staff of the Collège de France